Una Ģērmane (born 2 September 1971) is a Latvian curler.

She was third for the Latvian team at the 2010 Ford World Women's Curling Championship in Swift Current, Canada. She also represented Latvia at the 2013 World Women's Curling Championship at home in Riga, Latvia, finishing in last place with a 1-10 record.

References

External links

Latvian female curlers
Living people
1971 births
21st-century Latvian women